Baltz is a surname. Notable people with the surname include:

Kirk Baltz (born 1959), American actor
Lewis Baltz (1945–2014), American photographer
Mark Baltz, American football official
Mary C. Baltz (1923–2011), American soil scientist
Meade Baltz (1912–1994), American businessman and politician
Stephen Baltz (1949–1960), American air crash fatality
Tim Baltz, American comedian
William N. Baltz (1860–1943), American politician